The Collapse of Price's Raid: The Beginning of the End in Civil War Missouri is a 2016 book by Mark A. Lause and is the second volume in his series about Price's Raid (a campaign during the American Civil War), after Price's Lost Campaign: The 1864 Invasion of Missouri.  The book, which is sourced to the Official Records of the War of the Rebellion and contemporary newspaper accounts, as well as to some secondary sources, takes up the story of Price's Raid in early October, after the goal of the campaign shifted, from being a full-scale invasion, to being a raid.

Reviewers noted that the book provided a detailed record of the troops’ movements in the campaign, and also described the political and racial aspects underlying reactions to the raid.  The work was criticized for its lack of maps, including one reviewer’s assertion that many readers would be forced to use an atlas in following the narrative.  It  likewise was criticized for lacking a separate bibliography, and for its reading’s potential difficulty;  still, the same reviewers also described the book as "well documented", and as useful to "serious students of the Civil War".

Content
The Collapse of Price's Raid was published in 2016 by the University of Missouri Press and was written by Mark A. Lause.  As the second volume in the series, after Price's Lost Campaign: The 1864 Invasion of Missouri, it picks up the story of Price's Raid in the middle of the campaign in early October.  By that point, Price had abandoned the idea of a full-scale invasion of Missouri, and instead began to focusing on raiding and gathering supplies.  Two of the book's primary sources are the Official Records of the War of the Rebellion and various contemporary newspapers' accounts, although some secondary source material was used.  Focuses of the book include the political considerations behind Union reactions to the raid, as well as the highly varied nature of the units, including Confederate States Army and Union Army personnel, in addition to various militia and bushwhacker units.  The roles of African Americans and Native Americans are mentioned in the work, with Lause contending that race played a significant role in decision-making during the campaign.  Also discussed are the effects of the raid on the local civilian populations.

Reception
The reviewer Kristen Anderson, writing for the Journal of Southern History, noted that the book's lack of maps was problematic, especially given that Lause provided very detailed descriptions of troops' movements that were difficult to visualize.  While noting that the book was overall well-researched, Anderson did note that a more detailed look at the effects of United States Native American policy on the campaign was comparatively underdeveloped.  David Sesser, reviewing for Arkansas Review, stated that Lause's book represented "an admirable job" of compiling the various unit movements during the campaign.  He also praised the book's detailed notes, although noting that the index left some to be desired.  The lack of a separate bibliography and the absence of maps were also noted by Sesser as shortcomings.  The book was criticized for its lack of background information, which was largely segregated into the first volume.  Overall, Sesser summarized the book as useful for "serious students of the Civil War", although he noted that it would be difficult for a "casual reader". The professor Patricia Owens reviewed the book for Kansas History.  Owens also criticized the lack of maps, going so far as to state that many readers would need an atlas for geographic comprehension.  She noted that the book was "well documented" despite the lack of a bibliography.  The large quantity of names mentioned in the book was also viewed as a potential for confusion by Owens.  Overall, Owens described the book as "informative" and noted that the discussions of Union political considerations would be of interest to Kansas history buffs, as they involved Governor of Kansas Thomas Carney.

References

Sources
 
 
 

Price's Missouri Expedition
History books about the American Civil War
University of Missouri Press books
2016 non-fiction books